James Bray (18 January 1853 – 30 August 1898) was an English professional cricketer. He played 22 first-class matches for Kent County Cricket Club between 1879 and 1882.

Early life
Bray was almost certainly born at Limehouse in London in 1853. Some sources give his birthplace as Sandwich in Kent, but this is probably the birthplace of his father, also James, who worked as a "hammer man" for a blacksmith. Bray grew up in London, living at Mile End with his mother Mary, by this time a widow, at the 1871 census, and the family later lived at Bow.

Career
In 1879 Bray was spotted bowling in the nets at Lord's by Kent player George Hearne―sources say in his "dinner hour". He made his debut for the county side in June of the same year in a match against Yorkshire at Sheffield. Although he was wicketless in Yorkshire's first innings, he took a five-wicket haul in the second innings, taking five wickets for the cost of 35 runs (5/35). He repeated the feat in both of his next two matches, taking 5/62 against Lancashire and 5/24 against Sussex, and was Kent's leading wicket-taker of the season, with 49 wickets in 1879 at a bowling average of 15.18 runs per wicket in the 11 first-class matches he played. This included nine wickets in the return match against Sussex and 8/103 in an innings against Surrey at The Oval.

A short man, described as "an extraordinary little terrier of a man" by Lord Harris and as "the shortest man I have ever seen on a cricket field" by Charles Igglesden, Bray bowled right-arm medium pace deliveries using a roundarm bowling style. He was described as "capable of turning the ball both ways" and was an accurate bowler. After playing in 11 of Kent's first-class matches in 1879 his career quickly declined. He played seven times in 1880, taking 24 wickets, and only twice in each of 1881 and 1882. He was described as having "not helped the county for some time" when he took ten-wickets in a match in against Sussex in 1882―his only ten-wicket haul― playing in a Kent team which Cricket magazine wrote suffered from "the want of a good bowler". He played only once more for Kent and his first-class career ended with a total of 87 wickets taken in his 22 matches. A poor batsman, he scored only 74 runs in his first-class career, with a highest score of just nine.

Following his rapid rise to prominence, Bray was employed as a professional coach at Eton College and at Cambridge University in 1880. He played club cricket in the Limehouse area in the early 1880s, and in 1883 took all ten wickets playing for Darwen Cricket Club against Werneth in Lancashire, at which point he was described as "the whilom Kent bowler". From 1884 he was the professional at Beckton Cricket Club. He qualified to play for Essex County Cricket Club, and in 1887 appeared twice for the county side before it had been granted first-class status, although he took only four wickets for the team.

Later life
Bray was listed as working as a general labourer in the 1891 census. He died at St Pancras in London in 1898 aged 45.

Notes

References

External links
 

1853 births
1898 deaths
English cricketers
Kent cricketers
People from Limehouse
Cricketers from Greater London